Bissell is a surname deriving from the Middle English "buyscel", meaning "measure of grain", as well as the Yiddish "Bissel" and "Biselman". Respelling of German "Biesel". Notable persons with that name include:

 A. Keith Bissell (born 1941), American politician
 Anna Sutherland Bissell (1846–1934), American manufacturing businesswoman
 Arthur D. Bissell (1844–1926), American transport businessman and banker
 Austin Bissell (died 1807), British Captain in the Royal Navy
 Bert Bissell (1902-1998), English mountain climber and peace activist
 Clark Bissell (1782-1857), American judge and politician, governor of Connecticut
 Claude Bissell (1916– 2000), Canadian author and educator
 Clayton Lawrence Bissell (1896–1972), American soldier
 Daniel Bissell (disambiguation), several people
 Emily Bissell (1861–1948),  American social worker and activist
 Emma Bissell (born 2001), English footballer
 Frank Bissell (disambiguation), multiple people
 Gene Bissell (1926–2016), American football player and coach
 George Bissell (industrialist) (1821–1884), American oil businessman
 George Edwin Bissell (1839–1920), American sculptor
 Hezekiah Bissell (1835–1928), American civil engineer
 Israel Bissell (1752-1823), American post rider
 James D. Bissell (born 1952), American art director
 Jean Galloway Bissell (1936–1990), American judge and attorney
 John Winslow Bissell (born 1940), American judge and attorney
 Keith Bissell (1912–1992), Canadian composer, conductor, and music educator
 Laura Bissell (born 1983), English road and track racing cyclist
 Melville Reuben Bissell (1843–1889), American entrepreneur and inventor
 Mina Bissell, Iranian-American biologist
 Nicholas L. Bissell Jr. (1947–1996), American prosecutor
 Patrick Bissell (1957–1987), American dancer
 Peter Bissell (1986–2007), English road and track racing cyclist
 Raymond Ward Bissell (1936–2019), American art historian
 Richard M. Bissell Jr. (1910–1994), American spy and intelligence officer
 Richard Pike Bissell (1913–1977), American author
 Silas Bissell (1942-2002), American activist
 Stanley Bissell (1906–1999), English wrestler
 Susan Bissell (21st century), UNICEF's Child Protection Section chief
 Tom Bissell (born 1974), American journalist, critic, and fiction writer
 Whit Bissell (1909–1996), American actor
 William Bissell (disambiguation), several people
 Wilson S. Bissell (1847–1903), American politician from New York

See also
 Bissell (disambiguation)

Ashkenazi surnames